The 1905 Oregon Agricultural Aggies football team represented Oregon Agricultural College (now known as Oregon State University) as an independent during the 1905 college football season. In their second and final season under head coach Allen Steckle, the Aggies compiled a 6–3 record and outscored their opponents by a combined total of 166 to 28. The Aggies defeated Washington State (29–0), Willamette (28–0), and Washington (16–0), and lost to California (0–10), Oregon (0–6), and the Multnomah Athletic Club (5–6). Bert Pilkington was the team captain.

Schedule

References

Oregon Agricultural
Oregon State Beavers football seasons
Oregon Agricultural Aggies football